, literally - "If you touch me, danger" is a 1966 Japanese film directed by Yasuharu Hasebe and based on the novel  by Michio Tsuzuki.

Synopsis
Daisuke Honda, a war photographer in Vietnam, meets Yuriko Sawanouchi, a stewardess on his plane back to Japan. After drinking with her at a Tokyo bar, he becomes involved in saving Yuriko from assassination by female ninjas. When trying to rescue Yuriko from kidnappers, Daisuke discovers a group of foreigners are hunting for a World War II-era treasure hidden on an island by Yuriko's father.

Cast
 Akira Kobayashi as Daisuke Honda
 Chieko Matsubara as Yuriko Sawanouchi
 Mieko Nishio as Fuyuko
 Kozue Kamo as Yoshie
 Tomoko Hamakawa as Natsuko
 Akemi Kita as Akiko
 Archie Hays, Jr. as American Gangster
 Keisuke Noro as Man A
 Shuntarō Tamamura as Man 1

Release
Black Tight Killers was released on February 12, 1966. It was released in the U.S. during this era. It was released in DVD format in Japan in 2005. Image Entertainment released the film on DVD in the United States. This DVD has the burned-in subtitles which were part of the film's original U.S. release.

Critical appraisal
Jonathan Crow of Allmovie notes that the influence of Hasebe's mentor Seijun Suzuki can be seen in Black Tight Killers. Like Suzuki, he uses the tropes of the gangster genre to create "a pop-art dreamscape" with "tail fins, flawless fashion, sudden and unexpected go-go dancing, cool jazz, and freakish violence". Hasebe's quirky use of gaudy color is singled out for comment in the review, which judges the film to be "wild, decadent fun".

In his survey of the pink film genre, Steve Fentone sums up Black Tight Killers with, "Chix with guns. What more do ya need?" Jasper Sharp writes that the plot is not especially impressive, but of Hasebe's visuals, he comments, "there is not a single individual sequence here that fails to deliver enough great dollops of saccharine-coated eye candy to satisfy even the most jaded visual gourmand". He concludes, "this simply magical film is a hoot from start to finish".

Bibliography

English

Japanese

Notes

1966 films
Films based on Japanese novels
Films directed by Yasuharu Hasebe
Nikkatsu films
1960s Japanese-language films
1966 directorial debut films
1960s Japanese films